Symphonion Dream is the ninth album by American country music band The Nitty Gritty Dirt Band. They were joined by guest musicians Leon Russell and Linda Ronstadt, along with actor Gary Busey, who was credited as "Teddy Jack Eddy", and played various percussion instruments.

Track listing
"Winter White (Wind Harp)"  (Jimmie Fadden) – 1:17
"Raleigh-Durham Reel"  (John McEuen, Jeff Hanna, James Ibbotson, Jimmie Fadden) – 3:31
"The Battle of New Orleans"  (Jimmy Driftwood) – 3:55
"Bayou Jubilee"  (Jeff Hanna) – 2:47
"Sally Was a Goodun"  (John McEuen, Jeff Hanna, James Ibbotson, Jimmie Fadden) – 0:44
"Hey Good Lookin'"  (Hank Williams) – 1:50
"Classical Banjo 1/Malaguena/Classical Banjo 2"  (John McEuen, Ernesto Lecuona) – 3:27
"Daddy Was a Sailor"  (Jimmie Fadden) – 2:54
"Sleeping on the Beach"  (Jimmie Fadden) – 1:32
"Santa Monica Pier"  (John McEuen) – 2:50
"Ripplin' Waters"  (James Ibbotson) – 5:55
"All I Have to Do is Dream"  (Boudleaux Bryant, Felice Bryant) – 3:51
"Mother of Love"  (Ken Edwards) – 2:43
"The Moon Just Turned Blue"  (J.D. Souther) – 2:43
"Got To Travel On"  (Paul Clayton, Larry Ehrlich, Dave Lazar) – 1:05
"Joshua Come Home"  (James Ibbotson) – 3:32
"Solstice (Wind Harp)"  (James Ibbotson) – 1:24
"Symphonion Montage"  (James Ibbotson) – :54

Personnel
The Band
John McEuen – guitar, banjo, fiddle, mandolin, steel guitar, vocals
Jimmie Fadden – guitar, harmonica, drums, vocals
Jeff Hanna – guitar, drums, vocals
Jimmy Ibbotson – guitar, bass, keyboards, drums, vocals
Contributing Artists
Les Thompson – bass, guitar, vocals
Leon Russell – piano, keyboards, synthesizer, drums, chimes, gourd, vocals
Linda Ronstadt – vocals
Gary Busey – drums, timbales, bells, cowbell
Paul Harris – piano
Alice McEuen – background vocals
Kae McEuen – background vocals
Rae Hanna – background vocals
Jim Ratts – background vocals
Mary McCreary – background vocals
Mary Stevens – background vocals

Production
Producer: William E. McEuen
Recording Engineer: Richie Cicero/Michael Denecke/Gary Mullen
Mixing: William E. McEuen/Baker Bigsby
Art Direction: n/a
Liner Notes: John Tobler

References
All information is from the album liner notes, unless otherwise noted.

Nitty Gritty Dirt Band albums
1975 albums
United Artists Records albums